Gorenje Dole is a small settlement in the hills above Gornje Pijavško in the Municipality of Krško in eastern Slovenia. The area is part of the traditional region of Lower Carniola. It is now included in the Lower Sava Statistical Region.

References

External links
Gorenje Dole on Geopedia

Populated places in the Municipality of Krško